In chemistry, the law of definite proportions, sometimes called Proust's law, or law of constant composition states that a given 
chemical compound always contains its component elements in fixed ratio (by mass) and does not depend on its source and method of preparation.  For example, oxygen makes up about 8/9 of the mass of any sample of pure water, while hydrogen makes up the remaining 1/9 of the mass: the mass of two elements in a compound are always in the same ratio. Along with the law of multiple proportions, the law of definite proportions forms the basis of stoichiometry.

History
The law of constant proportion was given by Joseph Proust in the spanish city of Segovia in 1797. This observation was first made by the English theologian and chemist Joseph Priestley, and Antoine Lavoisier, a French nobleman and chemist centered on the process of combustion. 

The law of definite proportions might seem obvious to the modern chemist, inherent in the very definition of a chemical compound.  At the end of the 18th century, however, when the concept of a chemical compound had not yet been fully developed, the law was novel. In fact, when first proposed, it was a controversial statement and was opposed by other chemists, most notably Proust's fellow Frenchman Claude Louis Berthollet, who argued that the elements could combine in any proportion. The existence of this debate demonstrates that, at the time, the distinction between pure chemical compounds and mixtures had not yet been fully developed.

The law of definite proportions contributed to, and was placed on a firm theoretical basis by, the atomic theory that John Dalton promoted beginning in 1803, which explained matter as consisting of discrete atoms, that there was one type of atom for each element, and that the compounds were made of combinations of different types of atoms in fixed proportions.

A related early idea was Prout's hypothesis, formulated by English chemist William Prout, who proposed that the hydrogen atom was the fundamental atomic unit. From this hypothesis was derived the whole number rule, which was the rule of thumb that atomic masses were whole number multiples of the mass of hydrogen. This was later rejected in the 1820s and 30s following more refined measurements of atomic mass, notably by Jöns Jacob Berzelius, which revealed in particular that the atomic mass of chlorine was 35.45, which was incompatible with the hypothesis. Since the 1920s this discrepancy has been explained by the presence of isotopes; the atomic mass of any isotope is very close to satisfying the whole number rule, with the mass defect caused by differing binding energies being significantly smaller.

Non-stoichiometric compounds/Isotopes

Although very useful in the foundation of modern chemistry, the law of definite proportions is not universally true. There exist non-stoichiometric compounds whose elemental composition can vary from sample to sample. Such compounds follow the law of multiple proportion. An example is the iron oxide wüstite, which can contain between 0.83 and 0.95 iron atoms for every oxygen atom, and thus contain anywhere between 23% and 25% oxygen by mass. The ideal formula is FeO, but due to crystallographic vacancies it is about Fe0.95O. In general, Proust's measurements were not precise enough to detect such variations.

In addition, the isotopic composition of an element can vary depending on its source, hence its contribution to the mass of even a pure stoichiometric compound may vary. This variation is used in radiometric dating since astronomical, atmospheric, oceanic, crustal and deep Earth processes may concentrate some environmental isotopes preferentially. With the exception of hydrogen and its isotopes, the effect is usually small, but is measurable with modern-day instrumentation.

Many natural polymers vary in composition (for instance DNA, proteins, carbohydrates) even when "pure".  Polymers are generally not considered "pure chemical compounds" except when their molecular weight is uniform (mono-disperse) and their stoichiometry is constant.  In this unusual case, they still may violate the law due to isotopic variations.

References

Amount of substance
Stoichiometry
Chemical formulas